A unionized cooperative is a cooperative, usually a worker cooperative, which is beholden to active legal involvement by trade unions in the representation of the worker-owners' interests.

While they may be considered unnecessary in most cases, trade union involvement and membership may be welcomed by some cooperatives, be it to show voluntary solidarity with the organized labor movement's own history of struggle or to allow workers to negotiate collectively for the furtherance of workers' special interests within the more democratic and representative cooperative. This may be considered similar to the functions of political parties, special interests lobbies, and civil society pressure groups in democratic political systems.

The labor contract negotiated becomes the baseline of benefits due to  the membership and guarantees to the community that the working  conditions are not unfavorable. Union membership also guarantees that  the worker cooperative will not operate on the basis of typical small  business sacrifice, where owner(s) sometimes work overtime to keep their  business afloat and expect similar sacrifices of their workers. Union  membership for worker cooperatives gives the enterprise a legitimate  standard of operations.

Firms converting to worker ownership may benefit from union membership because a union provides an experienced structure for integrating the  needs of business with democratic influence from workers on management  decisions.

Difference from Union-backed ESOPs
Employee ownership through ESOPs, in Western countries, are often backed by trade unions, which usually assume a large or commanding stake in the company through such plans. However, ESOPs are not the same as full-fledged worker cooperatives, as ESOPs still retain a structure which is a mixture of private and cooperative elements.

References

Trade unions
Cooperatives